Darya Bon (also Romanized as Daryā Bon) is a village in Kharajgil Rural District, Asalem District, Talesh County, Gilan Province, Iran. At the 2006 census, its population was 100, in 19 families.

References 

Populated places in Talesh County